Shade Thomas-Fahm, born Victoria Omọ́rọ́níkẹ Àdùkẹ́ Fọlashadé Thomas (but known colloquially and professionally as "Shadé Thomas"), is a Nigerian fashion designer. She regarded as Nigeria's first modern fashion designer" and pioneer. She was the first fashion designer to open a fashion boutique in Nigeria. Fahm brought attention to the Nigerian fashion industry.
Her enduring impact will be celebrated at London's Victoria and Albert Museum (V&A) in London in 2022.

Biography 
Thomas-Fahm was born, on September 22, 1933, to the family of Bankole Ayorinde Thomas and Elizabeth Olaniwun Thomas. She attended St. Peter's School, Faaji, Baptist Girl's School Araromi, and later New Era Girls' College, both in Lagos.

In the 1950s, as was the practice at the time, she applied to go to England to study as a nurse. She left in the summer of 1953. But on getting to England, she was captivated by the well-fitted shops of the West End of London and took to fashion.

She said part of her interest in returning to Nigeria then, right before the nation got its independence, was "to provide jobs for people and tackle unemployment" 

At the beginning, she had a hard time convincing Nigerians to buy local fabrics and design, because people felt that British culture was better.

Throughout the sixties, her Shadé's Boutique, and clothing shops in Lagos became the go-to place for Nigerian-made outfits of different styles.

Thomas-Fahm influenced a lot of her contemporaries, from the 70s to date. Some of them include Abah Folawiyo, Betti O, Folorunsho Alakija, and Nike Okundaye, who all have had great impact on Nigerian fashion.

Legacy 
Thomas-Fahm specialized in the use of locally woven and dyed textiles to make modern contemporary styles that became known in Nigeria and around the world. 
She transformed iro and buba into a wrapper skirt; and the creation of the 'ajuba now popularly known as the 'boubou' form men's agbada.

She was the president of the Rotary Club of Victoria Island from 2009 to 2010.

References

1933 births
Nigerian women fashion designers
Year of death missing